The 2010–11 season of the Belgian Second Division (also known as EXQI League for sponsorship reasons) started on Wednesday 18 August 2010 and finished in May 2011. OH Leuven won the title on the penultimate matchday after a 2–2 draw away to Antwerp. Mons also got promoted after winning the playoffs.

Team changes
As a result of the bankruptcy of Mouscron in the first division, the team was automatically demoted to third division. No extra team was promoted to fill this spot and the league therefore moved from 19 teams to the more convenient 18.

In
 Roeselare relegated from the Pro League
 Heist promoted from Third Division A
 Visé promoted from Third Division B
 Rupel Boom promoted after winning the third division playoffs

Out
 Lierse was promoted to the Pro League
 Eupen won the second division final round and was therefore also promoted to the Pro League.
 Ronse lost the third division playoffs and was subsequently relegated.
 Beveren did not apply for a professional license due to financial problems. As a result, they were automatically relegated, but they chose to merge with second division team K.V. Red Star Waasland to form Waasland-Beveren and as such remain in second division.
 Liège was relegated to the Third Division.

Team information

Personnel and locations

Regular season

League table

Period winners
The season is divided into three periods. The first ten matchdays form period 1, matchdays 11 to 22 form period two and the last 12 form period three. The three period winners take part in the Belgian Second Division Final Round together with the winner of the 2010–11 Belgian Pro League relegation playoff. The winner of this final round gets to play in the 2011–12 Belgian Pro League. In case one or more periods are won by the team winning the league or in case one team wins multiple periods, the extra places go the teams finishing the highest in the league not already qualified. So in the theoretical case that one team wins all three periods and becomes the league champion, then the teams in positions 2, 3 and 4 will take part in the final round.

Period 1

Period 2

Period 3

Results

Top scorers
25 goals
  Hamdi Harbaoui (Oud-Heverlee Leuven)

21 goals
  Kevin Oris (Royal Antwerp F.C.)

20 goals
  Jeroen Ketting (Lommel United)

18 goals
  Mustapha Jarju (R.A.E.C. Mons)

17 goals
  Guillaume Legros (C.S. Visé)
  Kamel Ouejdide (Boussu Dour Borinage)

16 goals
  Bram Criel (K.S.K. Heist)
  Jan de Langhe (K. Standaard Wetteren)

15 goals
  Jordan Remacle (Oud-Heverlee Leuven)

14 goals
  Jérémy Perbet (R.A.E.C. Mons)
  Dalibor Veselinović (FC Brussels)

References

Belgian Second Division seasons
2010–11 in Belgian football
Belgian